Troy Merritt (born October 25, 1985) is an American professional golfer who has played on the PGA Tour and the Web.com Tour. He is a two-time winner on the PGA Tour, with his most recent win coming at the 2018 Barbasol Championship.

Early life
Merritt was born in Osage, Iowa, but moved to Minnesota and played high school golf at Spring Lake Park. He played college golf at Winona State University until after his sophomore year, when he transferred to Boise State University. He was first team All-WAC for Boise State and tied the school-record for a low round score when he posted a 62 (-9) in the second round of the District VII Shootout.

Professional career
Merritt turned professional in 2008. Merritt's first win on the Nationwide Tour came on September 6, 2009 when he won a $117,000 purse at the Mexico Open, beating Australia's Adam Bland with a 20-foot birdie putt on the first hole of a playoff.

On December 7, 2009, Merritt became only the third golfer to medal at the PGA Tour Qualifying Tournament by leading after every round. Despite a double-bogey on the final (108th) hole of the six round tournament he won by one stroke over veteran Jeff Maggert with a score of 22-under-par. In 2010, Merritt finished 125th on the PGA Tour, earning the final spot to retain a tour card.

On April 17, 2015, Merritt tied the course record at the Heritage on Hilton Head Island with a 10-under-par 61, matching David Frost’s tournament mark set in 1994. Merritt shot his 61 after Jordan Spieth, the 2015 Masters champion, recovered from an opening-round 74 to shoot 62. Merritt finished the tournament behind Jim Furyk and Kevin Kisner, and earned $401,200 for finishing alone in third.

Merritt recorded his first PGA Tour win at the 2015 Quicken Loans National. He set a course record at Robert Trent Jones Golf Club with a 61 in the third round and held off all challengers to win by three shots at 18-under 266. 

Merritt won his second PGA Tour event at the 2018 Barbasol Championship. He started with a 62 and a final round 67 gave him a one-stroke victory. The tournament was not completed until the Monday after bad weather during the tournament. Eleven days after his win Merritt underwent emergency surgery to remove a blood clot that stretched from his chest into his bicep.

In July 2021, Merritt shot 18-under par for 72 holes to tie with Cameron Davis and Joaquín Niemann for the lead at the Rocket Mortgage Classic. Niemann was eliminated with a bogey on the first playoff hole. Merritt ultimately bogeyed the fifth playoff hole and Davis won with a par.

Personal life
Merritt currently resides in Boise, Idaho with his wife, Courtney Achter, and two sons.

Professional wins (3)

PGA Tour wins (2)

PGA Tour playoff record (0–1)

Nationwide Tour wins (1)

Nationwide Tour playoff record (1–0)

Results in major championships
Results not in chronological order in 2020.

CUT = missed the half-way cut
"T" = tied
NT = No tournament due to COVID-19 pandemic

Results in The Players Championship

CUT = missed the halfway cut
"T" indicates a tie for a place
C = Canceled after the first round due to the COVID-19 pandemic

Results in World Golf Championships

See also
2009 PGA Tour Qualifying School graduates
2013 Web.com Tour Finals graduates
2017 Web.com Tour Finals graduates

References

External links

American male golfers
Boise State Broncos men's golfers
PGA Tour golfers
Korn Ferry Tour graduates
Golfers from Iowa
Golfers from Minnesota
Winona State University alumni
People from Osage, Iowa
Sportspeople from Boise, Idaho
1985 births
Living people